Hexagenia orlando is a species of common burrower mayfly in the family Ephemeridae. It is found in North America.

References

Mayflies
Articles created by Qbugbot
Insects described in 1931